The Battle of Texel was a sea battle fought during the Nine Years' War on 29 June 1694, when a force of 8 French ships, under Jean Bart, recaptured a French convoy, which had earlier that month been taken by the Dutch, and captured 3 ships of the 8-ship escorting force under Hidde de Vries. De Vries was captured by the French, but shortly after died of wounds.

Context
In 1692 and 1693 there were massive harvest failures in France, leading to acute famine and epidemics. From 1693 to 1694 over 2 million people died. Therefore, France needed to import large quantities of grain from neutral countries like Poland, Sweden and Denmark.

On 29 May 1694 Jean Bart was instructed to sail to Norway, to escort a huge fleet of 120 ships full of grain to France. The convoy didn't wait for the arrival of Bart's squadron and left under the protection of 3 neutral warships (2 Danish and one Swedish).

The battle
The convoy was immediately captured by the Dutch without a shot being fired. Jean Bart searched for the convoy and found it on 29 June at 3:00 a.m. before the Dutch island of Texel. Despite having fewer guns than the Dutch, at 5:00 a.m. Jean Bart attacked the Dutch flagship of Hidde de Vries. After a fierce battle which lasted only half an hour, the Prins Friso was captured, with Hidde Sjoerds de Vries severely wounded and taken prisoner. Two other Dutch ships were also taken, with the remaining five fleeing to their harbor. The Dutch losses amounted to 100 killed, 129 wounded and 455 prisoners.

Jean Bart repaired the damage to his ships and took the convoy to Dunkirk, where it arrived on 3 July, received by an enormous crowd celebrating their hero. On 5 July Jean Bart, his son François Cornil and his brother-in-law were invited to Versailles and congratulated by King Louis XIV in person. Jean Bart was raised into the nobility on 4 August 1694.

Hidde Sjoerds de Vries died of his wounds on 1 July 1694.

Ships involved

France (Jean Bart)
Maure 54 (flag)
Fortuné 50
Adroit 44
Jersey 50
Comte 50
Mignon 50
Bienvenu 24 (merchantman)
Portefaix 24 (merchantman)
Biche (corvette)

Netherlands (Hidde Sjoerds de Vries)
Prins Friso 58 (flag) - Captured by Maure
Zeerijp 34 - Captured by Fortuné
Statenland 50 - Captured by Mignon
Amalia 58
? 54
? 50
? 50
? 40
120 or more merchant ships - captured that day or soon after

Notes

References
Haws, Duncan; Hurst, Alexander Anthony (1985). The Maritime History of the World: A Chronological Survey of Maritime Events from 5,000 B.C. Until the Present Day, Supplemented by Commentaries. Brighton, Sussex: Teredo Books. .

External links
An account of the battle by Jean Bart (French)
La Bataille du Texel (French)

Conflicts in 1694
1694 in the Dutch Republic
Military history of the North Sea
Naval battles of the Nine Years' War
Naval battles involving the Dutch Republic
Naval battles involving France
Battles in North Holland
Battle